Sir Brian Crowe  (5 January 1938 – 23 March 2020) was a British diplomat, who was Ambassador to Austria, 1989–1992.

He was born on 5 January 1938, the son of Eric Crowe, a diplomat, and Virginia Teusler. His grandfather was Sir Eyre Crowe. He was educated at Waterkloof House Preparatory School, Sherborne School and Magdalen College, Oxford.

Crowe died on 23 March 2020 due to COVID-19.

Bibliography

References 

1938 births
2020 deaths
Members of HM Diplomatic Service
Deaths from the COVID-19 pandemic in the United Kingdom
Alumni of Magdalen College, Oxford
People educated at Sherborne School
Crowe family
Ambassadors of the United Kingdom to Austria
Knights Commander of the Order of St Michael and St George
20th-century British diplomats